Golden rice is a variety of rice (Oryza sativa) produced through genetic engineering to biosynthesize beta-carotene, a precursor of vitamin A, in the edible parts of the rice. It is intended to produce a fortified food to be grown and consumed in areas with a shortage of dietary vitamin A. Vitamin A deficiency causes xerophthalmia, a range of eye conditions from night blindness to more severe clinical outcomes such as keratomalacia and corneal scars, and permanent blindness. Additionally, vitamin A deficiency also increases risk of mortality from measles and diarrhea in children. In 2013, the prevalence of deficiency was the highest in sub-Saharan Africa (48%; 25–75), and South Asia (44%; 13–79).

Although golden rice has met significant opposition from environmental and anti-globalisation activists, more than 100 Nobel laureates in 2016 encouraged use of genetically modified golden rice which can produce up to 23 times as much beta-carotene as the original golden rice.

History

Research for development of golden rice began as a Rockefeller Foundation initiative in 1982.

In the 1990s, Peter Bramley discovered that a single  phytoene desaturase gene (bacterial CrtI) can be used to produce lycopene from phytoene in GM tomato, rather than having to introduce multiple carotene desaturases that are normally used by higher plants. Lycopene is then cyclized to beta-carotene by the endogenous cyclase in golden rice. The scientific details of the rice were first published in 2000, the product of an eight-year project by Ingo Potrykus of the Swiss Federal Institute of Technology and Peter Beyer of the University of Freiburg.

The first field trials of golden rice cultivars were conducted by Louisiana State University Agricultural Center in 2004. Additional trials were conducted in the Philippines, Taiwan, and in Bangladesh (2015). Field testing provided an accurate measurement of nutritional value and enabled feeding tests to be performed. Preliminary results from field tests showed field-grown golden rice produces 4 to 5 times more beta-carotene than golden rice grown under greenhouse conditions.

Crossbreeding 
As of 2018, breeders at the Philippine Rice Research Institute, the Bangladesh Rice Research Institute, and the Indonesian Centre for Rice Research were developing golden rice versions of existing rice varieties used with their local farmers, retaining the same yield, pest resistance, and grain qualities. Golden rice seeds may cost farmers the same as other rice varieties.

Approvals 
In 2018, Canada and the United States approved golden rice, with Health Canada and the US Food and Drug Administration (FDA) declaring it safe for consumption. This followed a 2016 decision where the FDA had ruled that the beta-carotene content in golden rice did not provide sufficient amounts of vitamin A for US markets. Health Canada declared that golden rice would not affect allergies, and that the nutrient contents were the same as in common rice varieties, except for the intended high levels of provitamin A.

In 2019, golden rice was approved for use as human food and animal feed or for processing in the Philippines. On 21 July 2021, the Philippines became the first country to officially issue the biosafety permit for commercially propagating vitamin A-infused golden rice. The approval came as the first commercial propagation authorisation of genetically engineered rice in South and Southeast Asia. As a result of the permission, golden rice can be grown on a commercial scale in accordance with the terms and conditions specified by the Philippines government.

Genetics 
Golden rice was created by transforming rice with two beta-carotene biosynthesis genes:
 psy (phytoene synthase) from daffodil (Narcissus pseudonarcissus)
 crtI (phytoene desaturase) from the soil bacterium Erwinia uredovora

(The insertion of a lcy (lycopene cyclase) gene was thought to be needed, but further research showed it is already produced in wild-type rice endosperm.)

The psy and crtI genes were transferred into the rice nuclear genome and placed under the control of an endosperm-specific promoter, so that they are only expressed in the endosperm. The exogenous lcy gene has a transit peptide sequence attached, so it is targeted to the plastid, where geranylgeranyl diphosphate is formed. The bacterial crtI gene was an important inclusion to complete the pathway, since it can catalyse multiple steps in the synthesis of carotenoids up to lycopene, while these steps require more than one enzyme in plants. The end product of the engineered pathway is lycopene, but if the plant accumulated lycopene, the rice would be red. Recent analysis has shown the plant's endogenous enzymes process the lycopene to beta-carotene in the endosperm, giving the rice the distinctive yellow colour for which it is named. The original golden rice was called SGR1, and under greenhouse conditions it produced 1.6 µg/g of carotenoids.

Golden Rice 2 
In 2005, a team of researchers at Syngenta produced Golden Rice 2. They combined the phytoene synthase (psy) gene from maize with crtl gene from the original golden rice. Golden Rice 2 produces 23 times more carotenoids than golden rice (up to 37 µg/g) because psy gene of maize is the most effective gene for carotenoid synthesis, and preferentially accumulates beta-carotene (up to 31 µg/g of the 37 µg/g of carotenoids).

Vitamin A deficiency

The research that led to Golden Rice was conducted with the goal of helping children who suffer from vitamin A deficiency (VAD). Estimates show that around 1.02 billion people are severely affected by micronutrient deficiencies globally, with vitamin A to be the most deficient nutrient in the body. In 2012, the World Health Organization reported that about 250 million preschool children are affected by VAD, and that providing those children with vitamin A could prevent about a third of all under-five deaths, which amounts to up to 2.7 million children that could be saved from dying unnecessarily. The World Health Organization has classified vitamin A deficiency as a public health problem affecting about one third of children aged 6 to 59 months in 2013, with the highest rates in sub-Saharan Africa (48 per cent) and South Asia (44 per cent).

VAS programs began in the 1990s in response to evidence demonstrating the association between VAD and increased childhood mortality. Between 1990 and 2013, more than 40 efficacy studies of VAS in children 6–59 months of age were conducted, and two systematic reviews and meta-analyses have concluded that VA supplements can considerably reduce mortality and morbidity during childhood. As of 2017, more than 80 countries worldwide are implementing universal VA supplementation (VAS) programs targeted to children 6–59 months of age through semi-annual national campaigns. Periodic, high-dose vitamin A supplementation is a proven, low-cost intervention which has been shown to reduce all-cause mortality by 12 to 24 per cent, and is therefore an important program in support of efforts to reduce child mortality. However, UNICEF and a number of NGOs involved in supplementation note more frequent low-dose supplementation is preferable.

As many children in VAD-affected countries rely on rice as a staple food, genetic modification to make rice produce the vitamin A precursor beta-carotene was seen as a simple and less expensive alternative to ongoing vitamin supplements or an increase in the consumption of green vegetables or animal products. Initial analyses of the potential nutritional benefits of golden rice suggested consumption of golden rice would not eliminate the problems of vitamin A deficiency, but could complement other supplementation. Golden Rice 2 contains sufficient provitamin A to provide the entire dietary requirement via daily consumption of some 75g per day.

Vitamin A deficiency is usually coupled to an unbalanced diet. Since carotenes are hydrophobic, sufficient fat must be present in the diet for golden rice (or most other vitamin A supplements) to alleviate vitamin A deficiency. Moreover, this claim referred to an early cultivar of Golden Rice; one bowl of the latest version provides 60% of RDA for healthy children. The RDA levels advocated in developed countries are far in excess of the amounts needed to prevent blindness.

Research
In 2009, results of a clinical trial of golden rice with adult volunteers concluded that "beta-carotene derived from golden rice is effectively converted to vitamin A in humans". A summary for the American Society for Nutrition suggested that "Golden Rice could probably supply 50% of the Recommended Dietary Allowance (RDA) of vitamin A from a very modest amountperhaps a cupof rice, if consumed daily. This amount is well within the consumption habits of most young children and their mothers". Beta-carotene is found and consumed in many nutritious foods eaten around the world, including fruits and vegetables. Beta-carotene in food is a safe source of vitamin A.

A 2012 study showed that the beta-carotene produced by golden rice is as effective as beta-carotene in oil at providing vitamin A to children. The study stated that "recruitment processes and protocol were approved".  However, in 2015, the journal retracted the study, claiming that the researchers had acted unethically when providing Chinese children golden rice without their parents' consent.

Golden rice improves vitamin A intake and may reduce vitamin A deficiency among women and children. Food derived from golden rice varieties is as safe as food derived from conventional rice varieties.

Controversy 

Critics of genetically engineered crops have raised various concerns. An early issue was that Golden Rice originally did not have sufficient beta-carotene content. This problem was solved by the advancing of GR2E event. The speed at which beta-carotene degrades once the rice is harvested, and how much remains after cooking are contested. However, a 2009 study concluded that beta-carotene from golden rice is effectively converted into vitamin A in humans.

Greenpeace opposes the use of any patented genetically modified organisms in agriculture and opposes the cultivation of golden rice, claiming it will open the door to more widespread use of GMOs. The International Rice Research Institute (IRRI) has emphasised the non-commercial nature of their project, stating that "None of the companies listed ... are involved in carrying out the research and development activities of IRRI or its partners in Golden Rice, and none of them will receive any royalty or payment from the marketing or selling of golden rice varieties developed by IRRI."

Vandana Shiva, an Indian anti-GMO activist, argued the problem was not the plant per se, but potential issues with loss of biodiversity. Shiva argued that golden rice proponents were obscuring the limited availability of diverse and nutritionally adequate food. Other groups argued that a varied diet containing foods rich in beta-carotene such as sweet potato, leaf vegetables and fruit would provide children with sufficient vitamin A. However, Keith West of Johns Hopkins Bloomberg School of Public Health has said that foodstuffs containing vitamin A are often unavailable, only available at certain seasons, or are too expensive for poor families to obtain.

In 2008, WHO malnutrition expert Francesco Branca cited the lack of real-world studies and uncertainty about how many people will use golden rice, concluding "giving out supplements, fortifying existing foods with vitamin A, and teaching people to grow carrots or certain leafy vegetables are, for now, more promising ways to fight the problem". Author Michael Pollan, who had criticized the product in 2001, being unimpressed by the benefits,  expressed support for the continuation of the research in 2013.

In 2012, controversy surrounded a study published in The American Journal of Clinical Nutrition. The study, involving feeding GM rice to children from 6 to 8 years old in China, was later found to have violated human research rules of both Tufts University and the federal government. Subsequent reviews found no evidence of safety problems with the study, but found issues with insufficient consent forms, unapproved changes to study protocol, and lack of approval from a China-based ethics review board. Additionally, the GM rice used was brought into China illegally.

Support 

The Bill and Melinda Gates Foundation supports the use of genetically modified organisms in agricultural development and supports the International Rice Research Institute in developing golden rice. In June 2016, 107 Nobel laureates signed a letter urging Greenpeace and its supporters to abandon their campaign against GMOs, and against golden rice in particular.

In May 2018, the U.S. Food and Drug Administration approved the use of golden rice for human consumption, stating: "Based on the information IRRI has presented to FDA, we have no further questions concerning human or animal food derived from GR2E rice at this time." This marks the fourth national health organisation to approve the use of golden rice in 2018, joining Australia, Canada and New Zealand who issued their assessments earlier in the year.

In December 2021, an opinion piece in Proceedings of the National Academy of Sciences of the United States of America called on regulators to "allow Golden Rice to save lives", which the authors say has been delayed due to "fear and false accusations", leading to estimated 266'000 lives lost per year due to vitamin A deficiency.

Protests 
On August 8, 2013, an experimental plot of Golden Rice being developed by IRRI and DA-PhilRice in Camarines Sur province of the Philippines was uprooted by protesters. British author Mark Lynas reported in Slate that the vandalism was carried out by a group of activists led by Kilusang Magbubukid ng Pilipinas (KMP) (unofficial translation: Farmers' Movement of the Philippines).

Distribution
A recommendation was made that golden rice be distributed free to subsistence farmers. Free licenses for developing countries were granted quickly due to the positive publicity that golden rice received, particularly in Time magazine in July 2000. Monsanto Company was one of the companies to grant free licences for related patents owned by the company. The cutoff between humanitarian and commercial use was set at US$10,000. Therefore, as long as a farmer or subsequent user of golden rice genetics would not make more than $10,000 per year, no royalties would need to be paid. In addition, farmers would be permitted to keep and replant seed.

See also

References

External links

 The Philippines Rice Research Institute – Golden Rice Questions and Answers

Genetically modified organisms in agriculture
Rice varieties

pt:Arroz#Arroz dourado